Sabrina Soledad Germanier (born 1999) is an Argentine volleyball player. She plays as a setter for the national volleyball team, Boca Juniors.

2020 Tokyo Summer Olympics 
Germanier participated in the 2020 Tokyo Olympics, where the Argentine women's volleyball team ranked 11th.

References 

1999 births
Living people
Argentine women's volleyball players
Volleyball players at the 2020 Summer Olympics
Olympic volleyball players of Argentina
21st-century Argentine women